Ancient Legends is a Chinese television series based on the myths and legends associated with the origins of the Chinese civilisation. It is based on stories in Chinese mythology and the ancient classic Shan Hai Jing. The series was first broadcast in mainland China on CCTV-1 from 15 August – 6 September 2010.

Plot
The story is based on the myths and legends associated with the origins of the Chinese civilisation and the earliest part of Chinese history under the Three Sovereigns and Five Emperors. After Pangu split Heaven and Earth and Nüwa created humankind, the world has been facing a plague. The Flower Goddess (the Jade Emperor's younger sister) and Shennong travel around China in search of a cure. They eventually sow the seeds of Heaven on Earth, causing flowers to blossom throughout the land, thus saving humankind. The plot also integrates other stories from Chinese mythology, such as Nüwa repairing the sky and Houyi shooting down nine suns.

Cast

 Vincent Chiao as Shennong
 Wen Qing as Flower Goddess
 Ding Jun as Yellow Emperor
 Liao Jingsheng as Jade Emperor
 Liu Dekai as Fu Xi
 Annie Wu as Second Fairy
 Liu Jia as Nüwa
 Zhou Zhong as Gong Gong
 Zhao Hongfei as Demonic Emperor / Dragon Crown Prince
 Han Dong as Chi You
 Ma Xiaohua as Kua Fu
 Xu Yun as Ruoxi
 Yi Kun as Rushou
 Duan Qiuxu as Erlang Shen
 Gao Yuqing as Taibai Jinxing
 Wang Xiuqiang as Taishang Laojun
 Wang Yunchao as Houyi
 Li Bo as Zhao Xuanlang
 Zhang Chunyan as Python Spirit (Red Lady)
 Bai Yun as Baoniang
 Li Xiaofeng as Du Kang
 Yang Jincheng as Jumang
 Song Yang as Zhu Rong
 Wang Yijian as Fenghou
 Duan Weiping as Yinglong
 Wang Ke as Fifth Fairy
 Chen Jie as Sixth Fairy
 Liu Ran as Seventh Fairy
 Wang Wenlin as Eldest Fairy
 Zhou Xiang as Third Fairy
 Sun Yanan as Fourth Fairy
 Chen Sanmu as Tu Di Gong
 Zhao Zhonghua as Limu
 Dai Xiaoxu as Cangjie
 Chi Huaqiong as Queen Mother
 Zang Xiuyun as Nüba
 Yue Ding as Kitchen God
 Yang Xiaodan as Kitchen Goddess
 Qiang Gaopeng as Xuanming
 Li Yuan as God of Plague
 Xu Rongjing as Lele
 Hong Zhibin as Liaoliao
 Wang Minghao as Azure Dragon
 Sun Hao as White Tiger
 Zhang Heng as Vermilion Bird
 Li Yang as Xuan Wu
 Liu Zhengliang as Teng
 Wang Haocheng as Fengmeng
 Hou Yong as Yinlingzi
 Wei Chenfei as Yuerou
 Zhong Bo as Yuqiang
 Ma Zijun as Dragon King
 Fang Yuan as Chang'e
 Zhu Jianfeng as Shentu
 Li Yuan as Yulei
 Sun Jiaolong as Xing Tian
 Chen Chen as Pixiu
 Yin Shuo as Count of Wind
 Huang Heng as Master of Rain
 Gao Rui as Mujue

Alternate titles
Alternate titles for the series include:

 Tales of the Past
 Huaxia Yanyi
 Chuanshuo
 Tiannü Sanhua

External links
  Ancient Legends on Sina.com

2010 Chinese television series debuts
2010 Chinese television series endings
Shenmo television series
Chinese mythology in popular culture